The Select Precision Effects At Range (SPEAR) Capability 3 is a future British air-to-ground and possibly anti-ship missile. It had been planned to be operational in 2025. However, in November 2021, Defence Procurement Minister Jeremy Quin told the House of Commons Select Defence Committee that full operating capability for SPEAR-3 on F-35 might not occur until 2028.

Background

MBDA UK was awarded an Assessment Phase contract for SPEAR 3, a standoff attack weapon. This is specified to have a range of at least 100 km, although current figures for SPEAR indicate a range over 130 km (80+mi). The weapon will make substantial reuse of technologies from the Brimstone precision strike missile that is used for engagements at shorter ranges. The  weapon will fly at high-subsonic speed using a turbojet and wing kit, and will feature a multimode seeker with INS/GPS guidance and datalink. The assessment phase concluded with flight trials in 2014 on the Eurofighter Typhoon. The missile is set to use the same Hamilton Sundstrand TJ-150 turbojet as the JSOW-ER.  MBDA has shown artwork of a three-missile launcher on a single Typhoon weapon station, and four will fit with a Meteor air-to-air missile in each internal weapons bay of the F-35B. In May 2016, the MOD awarded a £411 million contract to MBDA for the development of the air-launched SPEAR 3 missile. SPEAR 3 will be integrated with the F-35 Block 4 software package and is also planned to be used on the Eurofighter Typhoon.

Trials
In March 2016, a SPEAR trials missile was launched from a Eurofighter Typhoon trials aircraft operated by BAE Systems at the QinetiQ Aberporth range in Wales. The missile transitioned through separation from the aircraft to powered flight before completing a series of manoeuvres, ending in a terminal dive to the desired point of impact. The missile accurately followed the planned trajectory and was well within simulation predictions; all trial objectives were achieved.

SPEAR EW
MBDA is also proposing a SPEAR Electronic Warfare version (SPEAR EW), a SEAD attack version for the RAF.
Networked swarm capability for SPEAR missiles is in development.

Operators
  - Scheduled to be fully operational with the Royal Air Force by 2028.
  - To be produced in collaboration with the Saudi Arabian Military Industries (SAMI).

See also
Future of the Royal Air Force
Future of the Royal Navy
GBU-53/B StormBreaker

References

External links
SPEAR 3

Air-to-surface missiles of the United Kingdom
Anti-tank guided missiles of the United Kingdom
Anti-ship missiles of the United Kingdom